The Crab Replenishment Reserve is a national park in Andros, the Bahamas.

Flora and fauna
The park provides habitat for land crabs.

References

National parks of the Bahamas
Andros, Bahamas